Ivan Ivanji (born 24 January 1929) is a Serbian author of many internationally renowned novels.

He was held in Auschwitz and Buchenwald during 1944 and 1945. He was Secretary General of the Yugoslav Writers' Union from 1982 - 1988. His most recent book is a fictionalized account of his pre-World War II experiences in the town of Zrenjanin (Betschkerek) in the Banat.  He translates his own works from Serbian into German.  Born in 1929 in Zrenjanin, Serbia he now lives in Vienna and Belgrade.

In 2017, he has signed the Declaration on the Common Language of the Croats, Serbs, Bosniaks and Montenegrins.

In April 2020, he was appointed honorary citizen of Weimar.

Works of Fiction
 Dioklecijan. Belgrad 1973 [East] Berlin 1976; Munich 1978, 
 Smrt za Zmajevoj steni. 1982. Dorsten 1984, 
 Konstantin. Belgrad 1988, Verlag Volk und Welt, Berlin 1988, 
 Schattenspringen. Vienna 1993, 
 Ein ungarischer Herbst, Vienna 1995, 
 Barbarossas Jude,  Vienna 1996, 
 Der Aschenmensch von Buchenwald. Vienna 1999, 
 Die Tänzerin und der Krieg. Vienna 2002,   Serbocroatian Title: Balerina i rat, 2003
 Geister aus einer kleinen Stadt, Vienna 2008,

Prizes
 ''2011  Austrian Cross for Science and Art, I Class Extraordinary

References

External links
 http://wordswithoutborders.org/contributor/ivan-ivanji/

1929 births
Living people
Writers from Zrenjanin
Serbian Jews
Serbian novelists
Serbian science fiction writers
Yugoslav science fiction writers
Signatories of the Declaration on the Common Language
Auschwitz concentration camp survivors
Buchenwald concentration camp survivors